The Monument to the Victims of the Soviet Occupation is a proposed monument in Chișinău, Moldova.

A commemorative stone was unveiled on 28 June 2010, as a monument to the victims of the Soviet occupation and the totalitarian communist regime, Soviet Occupation Day in Moldova. It is located on Great National Assembly Square, formerly known as Victory Square and once home to the central monument to Vladimir Lenin of Soviet Moldavia. It is prominent in front of Government House, originally the seat of the Council of Ministers of the Moldavian SSR and now of the Cabinet of Moldova. In English, the inscription on the stone reads:

Gallery

See also 
 Memorial to Victims of Stalinist Repression

References

External links
 La Chișinău a fost dezvelită piatra comemorativă în memoria victimelor
 Monument în memoria victimelor ocupației sovietice și ale regimului totalitar comunist la Chișinău
 Victimele regimului totalitar comunist vor avea un monument în Piața Marii Adunări Naționale
 Monument în memoria victimelor ocupației sovietice și ale regimului totalitar comunist
 Victimele regimului totalitar comunist vor avea un monument în Piața Marii Adunări Naționale
 Monument în memoria victimelor ocupației sovietice și ale regimului totalitar comunist
 Victimele regimului totalitar comunist vor avea un monument în Piața Marii Adunări Naționale
 Anti-Soviet monument irks Russia
 Victimele regimului totalitar comunist vor avea un monument în Piața Marii Adunări Naționale
 Monument in memoria victimelor ocupatiei...
 Monument în memoria victimelor ocupației sovietice și ale regimului totalitar comunist

Monuments and memorials in Chișinău
2010 in Moldova
2010 sculptures
Memorials to victims of communism
Anti-communism in Moldova
Political repression
Stone sculptures